Vladimir Mikheyev (born 7 February 1957) is a Russian former swimmer. He competed in two events at the 1976 Summer Olympics for the Soviet Union.

References

1957 births
Living people
Russian male swimmers
Olympic swimmers of the Soviet Union
Swimmers at the 1976 Summer Olympics
Universiade medalists in swimming
Swimmers from Moscow
Universiade silver medalists for the Soviet Union
Medalists at the 1977 Summer Universiade
Soviet male swimmers